Alfonso Ferrero La Marmora (18 November 18045 January 1878) was an Italian general and statesman. His older brothers include soldier and naturalist Alberto della Marmora and Alessandro Ferrero La Marmora, founder of the branch of the Italian army now called the Bersaglieri.

Biography

On 5 August 1848 he liberated Charles Albert of Sardinia from a revolutionary mob in Milan, and in October was promoted general and appointed Minister of War. After suppressing the revolt of Genoa in 1849, he again assumed in November 1849 the portfolio of war, which, save during the period of his command of the Crimean expedition, he retained until 1859.

He took part in the war of 1859 against Austria; and in July of that year succeeded Cavour in the premiership. In 1860 he was sent to Berlin and Saint Petersburg to arrange for the recognition of the kingdom of Italy and subsequently he held the offices of governor of Milan and royal lieutenant at Naples, until, in September 1864, he succeeded Marco Minghetti as premier. In this capacity he modified the scope of the September Convention by a note in which he claimed for Italy full freedom of action in respect of national aspirations to the possession of Rome, a document of which Visconti-Venosta afterwards took advantage when justifying the Italian occupation of Rome in 1870.

In April 1866 La Marmora concluded an alliance with Prussia against Austria-Hungary, and, on the outbreak of the Third Italian War of Independence in June, took command of an army corps. He is largely credited of the hesitant conduct of the first phases of the Italian invasion, which, despite the large Italian superiority, led to the defeat in the battle of Custoza on 23 June. Accused of treason by his fellow countrymen, in particular by other high rank generals, and of duplicity by the Prussians, he eventually published in defence of his tactics (1873) a series of documents entitled Un po' più di luce sugli eventi dell'anno 1866 ("More light on the events of 1866"), a step which caused irritation in Germany, and exposed him to the charge of having violated state secrets.

Meanwhile, he had been sent to Paris in 1867 to oppose the French expedition to Rome, and in 1870, after the occupation of Rome by the Italians, had been appointed lieutenant-royal of the new capital. He died in Florence on 5 January 1878. La Marmora's writings include Un episodio di risorgimento italiano (1875) and Il segreto di stato nel governo costituzionale (1877).

References

1804 births
1878 deaths
Military personnel from Turin
Prime Ministers of Italy
Italian people of the Italian unification
Foreign ministers of Italy
Prime ministers of the Kingdom of Sardinia
Politicians from Turin
People of the Crimean War
Honorary Knights Grand Cross of the Order of the Bath
Members of the Chamber of Deputies (Kingdom of Italy)
Deputies of Legislature VIII of the Kingdom of Italy
Deputies of Legislature IX of the Kingdom of Italy
Deputies of Legislature X of the Kingdom of Italy
Deputies of Legislature XI of the Kingdom of Italy
Deputies of Legislature XII of the Kingdom of Italy
People of the First Italian War of Independence
People of the Second Italian War of Independence
People of the Third Italian War of Independence
Italian generals